Harry Ransom is the name of:

Harry Ransom (academic administrator)
Harry Ransom Center, named after him
Harry Ransom (footballer)